Aquiles Nazoa (Caracas, 17 May 1920 - 26 April 1976) was a Venezuelan writer, journalist, poet and humorist. His work expressed the values of popular Venezuelan culture.

He worked in the newspaper El Universal as a packer, later becoming a proof-reader. He had also begun to read English and French which allowed him to work simultaneously as a tourist guide in the Museo de Bellas Artes. He became the correspondent of El Universal in Puerto Cabello and was arrested in 1940 for defamation and slanderous allegations when criticising the Municipal authorities.

He worked in Tropical Radio, had a column in El Universal entitled Punta de lanza (spearhead), and was reporter for the newspaper Últimas Noticias. He collaborated in the weekly magazine El Morrocoy Azul and the newspaper El Nacional. He wrote for the Colombian magazine, Sábado (Saturday) and lived a year in Cuba. In 1945, he became editor of the magazine Fantoches. In 1956, he was expelled from the country by the regime of Marcos Pérez Jiménez, but returned in 1958.

In 1948, Nazoa obtained the Premio Nacional de Periodismo (National Journalism Prize) in the
humour and customs section. He was also awarded the Premio Municipal de Literatura del Distrito Federal (Municipal Prize for Literature of the Federal District) in 1967.

He died in an automobile accident between Caracas and Valencia.

Published works
Caperucita criolla (Creole Little Red Riding-Hood), 1955
Poesía para colorear (Poetry for colouring), 1958
El burro flautista (The flautist donkey), 1958
Los dibujos de Leo (Leo's drawings), 1959
Caballo de manteca (Butter Horse), 1960
Los poemas (The Poems), 1961
Cuba de Martí a Fidel Castro (Cuba from Martí to Fidel Castro), 1961
Mientras el palo va y viene (While the pole comes and goes), 1962
Poesías costumbristas, humorísticas y festivas (Poems of customs, humourist and festival), 1963
Pan y circo (Bread and Circus), 1965
Los humoristas de Caracas (The humorists of Caracas), 1966
Caracas física y espiritual (Caracas - physical and spiritual), 1967
Historia de la música contada por un oyente (History of music as told by a listener), 1968
Humor y amor de Aquiles Nazoa (The humour and love of Aquiles Nazoa), 1969
Retrato hablado de matapalo (Spoken portrait of Ficus sp.),1970
Venezuela suya (His Venezuela), 1971
Los sin cuenta usos de la electricidad (The countless uses of electricity), 1973
Gusto y regusto de la cocina venezolana (Taste and aftertaste of Venezuelan cookery), 1973
Vida privada de las muñecas de trapo (Private life of the rag dolls), 1975
Raúl Santana con un pueblo en el bolsillo (Raúl Santana with a town in his pocket), 1976
Genial e Ingenioso: La obra literaria y gráfica del gran artista caraqueño Leoncio Martínez (Brilliant and Ingenious: The literary and graphical work of the great Caracas artist Leoncio Martinez), 1976
Aquiles y la Navidad (Aquiles and Christmas), 1976

Notes
Aquiles is the Spanish name of the Greek hero Achilles.
Museo de Bellas Artes is the Museum of Fine Arts.
Morrocoy is a common Venezuelan species of tortoise.  Azul is blue.
Fantoches are buffoons or puppets.
Mientras el palo va y viene seems figuratively to refer to his time in exile.  "While the club swings, the ribs recover".

Trivia 

 In 2005 Ildemaro Torres made a biographical book about the life of Aquiles Nazoa, for the Biblioteca Biográfica Venezolana, with the seal of El Nacional.

External links
  El Transeunte Sonreido - Aquiles Nazoa 

1920 births
1976 deaths
People from Caracas
Road incident deaths in Venezuela
Venezuelan journalists
Venezuelan male poets
20th-century Venezuelan poets
20th-century male writers
20th-century journalists